Cyperus tanyphyllus is a species of sedge that is native to parts of Angola in south western Africa.

See also 
 List of Cyperus species

References 

tanyphyllus
Plants described in 1884
Flora of Angola
Taxa named by Henry Nicholas Ridley